Lynde Bradley (August 19, 1878 – February 8, 1942), the brother of Harry Lynde Bradley, was the co-founder of the Allen-Bradley Company and the Lynde and Harry Bradley Foundation.

Bradley was born in Milwaukee, Wisconsin and attended Milwaukee Public Schools MPS.

"In 1901, Lynde was working for Milwaukee Electric when he came up with an idea for improving the controllers that regulate motor speed. He quit his job, secured a $1,000 investment from Dr. Stanton Allen, and founded the Allen-Bradley Company. Harry joined his brother three years later, and together they turned a two-man shop into a major center of industry."

Bradley formed plans to create a foundation shortly before his death, and the Lynde Bradley Foundation was established by his estate soon after his death.

References

1878 births
1942 deaths